An annular solar eclipse occurred on January 4–5, 1992. A solar eclipse occurs when the Moon passes between Earth and the Sun, thereby totally or partly obscuring the image of the Sun for a viewer on Earth. An annular solar eclipse occurs when the Moon's apparent diameter is smaller than the Sun's, blocking most of the Sun's light and causing the Sun to look like an annulus (ring). An annular eclipse appears as a partial eclipse over a region of the Earth thousands of kilometres wide. Annularity was visible in the Federal States of Micronesia, Nauru, Kiribati, Baker Island, Palmyra Atoll, Kingman Reef, and southwestern California, including the southwestern part of Los Angeles.

The duration of annularity at maximum eclipse (closest to but slightly shorter than the longest duration) was 11 minutes, 40.9 seconds in the Pacific. It will have been the longest annular solar eclipse until January 2, 3062, but the solar eclipse of December 24, 1973 lasted longer.

Images

Related eclipses

Eclipses of 1992 
 An annular solar eclipse (ascending node) on January 4.
 A partial lunar eclipse (ascending node) on June 15.
 A total solar eclipse (descending node) on June 30.
 A total lunar eclipse (descending node) on December 9.
 A partial solar eclipse (ascending node) on December 24.

Solar eclipses of 1990–1992

Saros 141

Tritos series

Metonic series

Notes

References

Photos:
 APOD Ring of Fire Revisited, annular eclipse at sunset

Template Solar eclipses

1992 1 4
1992 in science
1992 1 4
January 1992 events